Abjapyx is a genus of diplurans in the family Japygidae.

Species
 Abjapyx lepesmei (Silvestri, 1948)

References

Diplura